This is a list of candidates for the 1976 New South Wales state election. The election was held on 1 May 1976.

Retiring Members
Note: Steve Mauger MLA (Liberal, Monaro) resigned some months prior to the election; a by-election was scheduled for the seat, but was cancelled when the general election was called.

Labor
 Dan Mahoney MLA (Parramatta)

Liberal
 David Hunter MLA (Ashfield)

Country
 Geoff Crawford MLA (Barwon)

Legislative Assembly
Sitting members are shown in bold text. Successful candidates are highlighted in the relevant colour. Where there is possible confusion, an asterisk (*) is also used.

See also
 Members of the New South Wales Legislative Assembly, 1976–1978
 Members of the New South Wales Legislative Council, 1976–1978

References
 

1976